In the context of the television series Fringe, Peter may refer to:
 Peter Bishop, one of the protagonists
 "Peter" (Fringe episode), season 2 episode 15 (2010)